The Trenton Golden Hawks are a Canadian Junior ice hockey team from Trenton, Ontario.  They are members of the Ontario Junior Hockey League, a part of the Canadian Junior Hockey League and a member of the Ontario Hockey Association and Hockey Canada.  The team relocated to Trenton in 2009, but were previously known as the Port Hope Predators of Port Hope, Ontario.  The team started in 1996 as the Port Hope Buzzards of the Metro Junior A Hockey League.

History
Previous to Junior A coming to Port Hope, and subsequently leaving it, the town has operated a series of Junior C teams by the name Port Hope Panthers.

Port Hope era (1996–2009)
In 1996, the Port Hope Buzzards were founded in the Metro Junior A Hockey League.  The league only lasted until 1998, when the Metro was absorbed by the larger and healthier Ontario Provincial Junior A Hockey League.

In November 2005, coach Bret Meyers was suspended for one season and the team was fined $4000 after the Ontario Hockey Association investigated the Predators over allegations of hazing and irresponsible public behaviour by the players of the team.  In January 2006, the Predators were fined $1000 and their director of operations Tim Clayden was suspended for one month for signing a player to a Junior C card without his knowledge.  In June 2007, the Ontario Hockey Association found Clayden guilty of tampering with players from the Cobourg Cougars' roster.  He was suspended for one year and the team was fined $5000.  In September 2007, Port Hope coach Brian Drumm was suspended for 20 games for striking a Lindsay Muskies player in the face during a game.  The team was also fined $3500.

Trenton era (2009–present)
In early 2009, the Trenton Hercs announced that they were folding mid-season and leaving the Ontario Junior Hockey League.  In March, rumblings of team moving into the Trenton market came afloat.  It turned out to be the Port Hope Predators.  According to OJHL commissioner Bob Hooper: “The league never really wanted a team in Port Hope in the first place.”  In the 2008-09 season, Port Hope was second in league attendance, while Trenton was ninth.

On April 2, 2009, the move and name change were announced.  The Port Hope Predators are now the Trenton Golden Hawks.

The Trenton Golden Hawks won their first Frank L Buckland Cup Trophy as OJHL playoff champions in 2016, by defeating the Georgetown Raiders in 7 games. From there, the Golden Hawks traveled north to Kirkland Lake to compete in the Dudley-Hewitt Up, where they went 3-0 in round-robin play and defeated the defending NOJHL champions and Dudley-Hewitt Cup champions Soo Thunderbirds in the final. Trenton traveled to Lloydminster, Alberta/Saskatchewan for the Royal Bank Cup. Trenton finished first with a 3-0-0-1 record, but were stunned in the semi-final by the hosts Lloydminster Bobcats, who won 6-2.

Season-by-season results

Playoffs

Dudley Hewitt Cup
Central Canada Championships
NOJHL - OJHL - SIJHL - Host
Round robin play with 2nd vs 3rd in semi-final to advance against 1st in the finals.

Royal Bank Cup
CANADIAN NATIONAL CHAMPIONSHIPS
Dudley Hewitt Champions - Central, Fred Page Champions - Eastern, Western Canada Cup Champions - Western & Runner Up, and Host
Round robin play with top 4 in semi-final and winners to finals.

References

External links
Golden Hawks Webpage

Ontario Provincial Junior A Hockey League teams
Ice hockey clubs established in 1996
1996 establishments in Ontario